David Gottesman (born February 3, 1948) is a former Democratic member of the New Hampshire Senate, representing the 12th District from 2004 to 2008. He was also the Democratic Whip in the New Hampshire Senate in 2008. One of Sen. Gottesman's most notable accomplishments came in 2007 with the passing of New Hampshire's SB-42-FN. Sen. Gottesman along with nine other state senators and four state representatives sponsored the bill, which prohibits smoking in public bars and restaurants and some other enclosed areas.

External links
The New Hampshire Senate - Senator David Gottesman official NH Senate website
Project Vote Smart - Senator David 'Dave' Gottesman (NH) profile
Follow the Money - David Gottesman
2006 2004 campaign contributions
New Hampshire Senate Democratic Caucus - David Gottesman profile 
Merrimack Journal - Feb 9, 2007

New Hampshire state senators
1948 births
Living people
New Hampshire lawyers